The 2022–23 Illinois Fighting Illini women's basketball team represents the University of Illinois during the 2022–23 NCAA Division I women's basketball season. The Fighting Illini are led by first-year head coach Shauna Green, and they play their home games at State Farm Center. This season marks the program's 41st season as a member of the Big Ten Conference.

Previous season

The Illini finished the 2021–22 season 7–20 overall, with a 1–13 record in Big Ten play to finish in last place. As the fourteenth seed in the Big Ten women's tournament, they defeated eleventh seed Wisconsin in the first round before losing to sixth seed Nebraska in the second round. They were not invited to participate in any post-season tournaments.

Offseason
After five seasons as Illinois head coach, Nancy Fahey announced her retirement on March 4, 2022. 

On March 21, 2022, Green was named as the program's tenth head coach, having had six successful seasons as the head coach at Dayton. All three of Green's assistant coaching hires at Illinois (Calamity McEntire, DeAntoine Beasley and Ryan Gensler) had previously worked for her at Dayton. The roster includes five players from Fahey's final Illinois team, four freshmen, and four transfers, including two from Dayton (Makira Cook and Brynn Shoup-Hill). Genesis Bryant transferred from North Carolina State, but she had been recruited by Green for Dayton before committing to the Wolfpack.

Roster

Schedule and results

|-
!colspan="6" style=| Exhibition

|-
!colspan="9" style=| Regular season

|-
!colspan="6" style=| Big Ten Women's Tournament

|-
!colspan=9 style=| NCAA Tournament

Rankings

See also
2022–23 Illinois Fighting Illini men's basketball team

References

External links
 Official website
 2022–23 media guide

Illinois Fighting Illini women's basketball seasons
Illinois
Fight
Fight
Illinois